Estela Gavidia was the first woman to graduate as a doctor in El Salvador, which occurred in 1945. She specialized in gynecology. At the time of her graduation, she was married and known as Dr. Grabowski, though she was eventually widowed.

References

Women physicians
Salvadoran gynaecologists